Marienlyst Manor is a manor house and estate located on the southernmost part of Zealand, overlooking the Færgestrøm, Vordingborg Municipality, in southeastern Denmark. Formerly a farm under Iselingen, it was incorporated as an independent manor in 1810. The main building dates from 1800 but owes its current appearance to a renovation undertaken after a fire in 1873.

History
Marienlyst (lit. 'Marie's Joy') was created as a farm under Iselingen. Reinhard Iselin's daughter Marie owned Iselingen from 1793 to 1803 and constructed the current main building in 1800.

In 1803, Iselingen was sold to brewer and former ship captain Jens Lind. In 1804, it was sold to first H. P. Reiersen and then to a consortium consisting of Peder Bech, Hans Wassard (1756é1839) and Just Michael Aagaard. In 1810, Marienlyst was incorporated as an independent manor with Wassard as the sole owner while Aagaard continued as the sole owner of Iselingen. 

 
Hans Wassard's first marriage was to Just Michael Aagaard's granddaughter, Lucie Emmerence Pedersdatter Aagaard (1761–1802). His second marriage was to Anna Marie Munk (1770–1838), daughter of the mayor of Copenhagen, Morten Munk (1730–1796), and Karen Barfred (1744–1780).

In 1839, Marienlyst passed to Morten Munk Wassard. On his death, it passed to his son Hans Mathias Wassard. His widow owned the estate until 1929. It was then passed down to their son M.M. Wassard.

Architecture
The main building consists of a two-storey main wing with a short cross wing at each end. The main wing is topped by a ridge turret.

Today
The estate is currently owned by Hans Mathias Munk Wassard.

Hans Wassard apple cultivar
The Hans Wassard apple cultivar was cultivated on the Marienlyst estate around 1850.

List of owners
 (1810–1839) Hans Wassard
 (1839–1870) Morten Munk Wassard
 (1870–1898) Hans Mathias Wassard
 (1898–1929) Augusta Wassard, née Ringberg
 (1929–1951) M.M. Wassard
 (1951– ) M.M. Wassard
 (1990–present) Hans Mathias Munk Wassard

References 

Manor houses in Vordingborg Municipality
Houses completed in 1800